Ganga de Silva is a Sri Lankan woman cricketer. She has played for Sri Lanka in 2 Women's ODIs.

References

External links 

Living people
Sri Lankan women cricketers
Sri Lanka women One Day International cricketers
Year of birth missing (living people)